The Southeast Texas Panthers, formerly the Beaumont Panthers, are an American basketball team based in Beaumont, Texas, and members of The Basketball League (TBL).

History
From 2008 to 2011, Southeast Texas was home to a professional basketball team as a member of the ABA originally known as the Mustangs, before renaming in 2009 as the Mavericks. The team had three successful seasons and decided to become a professional basketball team. The team requested to join the NBA G League but the offer was declined.  The ownership decided to sit the team out for three seasons and move the team to Shreveport, Louisiana in 2013. 

On June 4, 2021 The Basketball League announced the Beaumont Panthers, led by retired professional basketball player Kendrick Perkins and his cousin, Jay McDonald, as an expansion team for the 2022 season.

References

The Basketball League teams
Sports in Beaumont, Texas
Basketball in Beaumont, Texas
2021 establishments in Texas